Teimoc Johnston-Ono (born July 26, 1955) is a judo competitor and instructor.

Career
Teimoc's martial arts training started during the summer of 1960 in the basement of a Buddhist church. His father believed judo, kendo, aikido, and kyūdō were essential parts of an education, so at age of 6 he began his lifelong study of Judo. Four years later, at the 1964 World's Fair, he demonstrated the art of Judo and Kendo at the Japanese pavilion, and over the following years he progressed rapidly in both disciplines. Amongst his instructors were Kiyoshi Shiina, Wally Jay, and Jimmy Bregman.

At the age of 16, Teimoc became one of the youngest Judo practitioners to receive the rank of Black Belt, winning titles in the Junior and Senior divisions, and in the High School Nationals the same year. He remained an accomplished high school wrestler and undefeated practitioner throughout his wrestling junior and senior career. In 1971 he qualified as an alternate for the 1972 Olympic Games, which earned him the nickname "The Kid". Four years later he captured a coveted spot on the 1976 Olympic Judo team.

Teimoc retired from competition in 1990 to become Head Coach of the US Olympic training center in Colorado Springs, and two years later he returned to his home in New York City to direct the Chelsea Piers Martial Arts program. He has also maintained a teaching, coaching, and representative position for the New York Athletic Club for over 40 years. As of 2009, he is head trainer of the 5 Points Academy in Chinatown, NYC.

Return to competitions
After a 14-year layoff, Teimoc returned to international competitions. In order to adapt himself, he was forced to redefine his training methodology. His new approach worked well as he is not only still active in competition, but has a winning record to prove it. Today he does the majority of his strength training and conditioning at the Parisi Speed School alongside athletes from the UFC, the IFL, and the NFL.

In 2003 Teimoc went to Brazil to compete in the World Masters Jiu Jitsu tournament, which he won. To date, he is undefeated and the only non-Brazilian to win both the Black Belt division and the Absolute Black Belt division. Returning in 2006, 2007 and 2008, he consecutively took back home first place awards in both divisions. He also received his Black belt in Brazilian jiu-jitsu in 2006 under Fabricio Martins Costa. Teimoc is the only practitioner to win the prestigious World Masters competition in both Judo and Brazilian jiu-jitsu.

Family 
Teimoc's brothers, Genji Ito and Teiji Ito were accomplished Japanese composers and performers. His mother, Teiko Ono, was a traditional and classical genre dancer.

Competition results

Judo
High School Nationals–135 lbs., First Place
Junior National Champion First Place 4X (USJA, USJF, Junior Olympics)

US National Championships Seniors
1988 Third Place
1987 Third Place
1983 Third Place
1982 Second Place
1981 Second Place
1980 Third Place
1978 First Place
1976 First Place
1972 Second Place

US Open
1989 Second Place
1986 Third Place
1981 Third Place (86 kg) & Open Division Third Place
1980 Third Place

Judo World Masters Championship
2008 Brussels, Belgium - Gold
2007 São Paulo, Brazil - Silver
2006 Tours, France - Silver
2005 Toronto, Ontario, Canada - Bronze
2003 Tokyo, Japan - Silver

Other Competition
2009 IJF Judo Veteran World Championship Bronze Medal, Germany.
2009 NYinternational open First place, World masters (Rio) Jiu Jitsu First place, International masters (San Diego) First place, Judo.
2009 WMJA World Championship, Gold Medal, 90 kg. M5, Atlanta, Ga.
2009 World Masters Jiu Jitsu Championships, Black Belt Division, First Place absolute Division
2008 World Masters Jiu Jitsu Championships, Black Belt Division, First Place and First Place absolute Division
2007 World Masters Jiu Jitsu Championships, Black Belt Division, First Place and First Place absolute Division
2006 World Masters Jiu Jitsu Championships, Black Belt Division, First Place and First Place absolute Division
2005 NAGA World Championships, Brown Belt Division, Gi, First Place
2004 Grapplers Quest, Gi, First Place and no Gi, Second Place
2004 NAGA World Jiu Jitsu Championships, Gi, First Place and First Place Masters (no rank)
2004 World Masters Jiu Jitsu Championships, Purple Belt Division, First Place and First Place Absolute Division
2003 World Masters Jiu Jitsu Championships, Blue Belt Division, First Place and First Place Absolute Division
1990 Quebec Open, Third Place JIUJITSU
1990 Cuban Cup, Third Place
1990 West German Open, Competitor
1990 Paris International, Competitor
1990 Tbilisi International Invitation, Competitor
1986 National Sports Festival, Second Place
1984 Dutch Open, Fourth Place
1983 US Wrestling Federation, National Open, Sombo Champion (90 kg)
1983 Pacific Rim, Bronze (as member of US National Team)
1979 Mexican Open, First Place
1978 AAU National Championships, First Place
1977 South African Championships for US National Team, First Place
1977 World Championship Trials, First Place
1977 Canadian National Exhibition, First Place
1976 AAU National Championships, US All American, First Place
1972 US Judo Tour, Japan

Recent awards 
Promotion to 8th dan judo (USAJUDO/IJF)
First degree Black Belt (USBJJF/IBJJF)
Black Belt (Renzo Gracie Academy)

References

External links 
 Teimoc Johnston-Ono - Official website

1955 births
Living people
American male judoka
Olympic judoka of the United States
Judoka at the 1976 Summer Olympics